Doris Young Siew Keen (born November 25, 1959) is a Singaporean director, producer, writer and actress. Given the stage name Marrie Lee, she was best known for her role as Cleopatra Wong in the late 1970s.

Early life
Young was born on November 25, 1959 in Singapore to the contractor John Young and his wife Mary. She had an older brother named Jimmy and an older sister named Betty. Due to her father's work with the cinema owners and film distributors, around the very young age of four and five, Young often met Hong Kong film actors and actress while they were promoting their movie screenings in Singapore, making her considered acting as one of her life goals. Her father later died when she was six and her mother died when she was sixteen.

Career
Following her graduation from St Anthony’s Convent Secondary School, Young worked as a receptionist or restaurant usher in a nightclub or restaurant at Shenton Way in about 1976, where she was discovered by a scouting team from Hong Kong and she received her first acting role, a minor role as a female detective based in Singapore for the Hong Kong film Showdown at the Equator. She was also involved in minor roles in a couple of Hong Kong-based films.

A year later in 1977, she answered a newspaper ad that asked "Are you smart, sexy and seductive?" The ad was placed by Suarez' BAS Film Productions, which was looking for a heroine who could ride a motorcycle. She auditioned in a miniskirt and boots and won the role among the 300 hopefuls.

Her screen name, Marrie Lee, was created by the producers to capitalize on the fame of the late Bruce Lee. Due to this, during her filming in some occasions, there were fans went up to her and said that they had watched all of her "brother's" films.  "Some fans thought that I was his younger sister", she later told The Business Times in a 2005 interview.

She made her film debut at age 18, portraying the title character Cleopatra Wong in 1978's They Call Her Cleopatra Wong, a martial arts film shot in Singapore and Philippines about a female Interpol agent written and directed by Bobby A. Suarez.

She reprised the role in 1979's Dynamite Johnson, in which she was teamed with the 10-year-old Singaporean Taekwondo practitioner Johnson Yap, who reprised his role as Sonny Lee respectively from The Bionic Boy, a 1978 film also written and directed by Suarez. She reprised her role for the third time in Devil's Angels, in which she led an all-female team of crimefighters in the Philippines.

She performed her own stunts during her filming, including jumping through a real glass window and dangling from a helicopter, and sustained many injuries, including a fractured left wrist.

In the early 1980s, Suarez was developing a film where Young would co-star with Weng Weng. The project never materialized. Her supposed reprisal as Cleopatra Wong as a supporting role on the film The Wandering Samurai was also never materialized as well. After her first three films, Suarez pleaded with her to sign a contract to make ten more movies, but she turned it down.

In 1980, She was offered a lead role as Charlie Chan's daughter Ling Chan in the American film Charlie Chan's Number One Daughter. However, due to the Hollywood labor strikes in 1980, 1981, and 1985. the production of this film never materialized.

Young retired from acting in 1981 and managed a dance troupe, The Devil's Angels (named after the members from her third Cleopatra Wong film), for two years, following that she was married and started a family. At some point when she was offered an acting opportunity, her husband said no. She later ran a healthcare company Tisco Pte Ltd with her sister Betty from 1989 onwards.

During the Screen Singapore festival from August 1 to 31 in 2005, Young was reunited with Bobby Suarez, with Suarez himself expressed his interest in doing a Cleopatra Wong reboot.

When Suarez died of a heart attack on February 8, 2010, Young inherited the franchise rights of Cleopatra Wong and its website. Also that year, Mark Hartley's documentary film Machete Maidens Unleashed! premiered. Young is interviewed in the documentary that explores exploitation films made in the Philippines in the 1970s and 1980s.

In December 2012, as Marrie Lee, she started a film making hobbyist group, Reel Frenz Productions, working as a director, producer and writer. She has helped produce at least 12 short films since then.

In 2013, Young was interviewed in the documentary The Search for Weng Weng.

With the help of her partner Jacqueline, she expanded her healthcare company to Hong Kong in 2014. She later established a film making company Singapore Cinema Pte Ltd in February 2015 to oversee her feature film projects.  Her first directorial debut feature film Certified Dead was released in 2016.

Family
Young had been married and divorced three times. In one of her marriage, film director and writer of Shirkers Sandi Tan is her ex-stepdaughter.

Filmography

Films

Short films

Documentaries

References

Bibliography

External links
 
 

1959 births
Living people
Singaporean film actresses
Singaporean stunt performers
Singaporean people of Chinese descent
Singaporean film directors
Singaporean women film directors
20th-century Singaporean actresses